Jan Wilton (born 30 April 1957) is an Australian former professional tennis player.

A native of Sydney, Wilton won a girls' doubles title at the 1976 Australian Open.

Wilton won through to the women's singles last eight of the 1977 Australian Open and took a set off the top-seeded Dianne Fromholtz in her quarter-final loss.

References

External links
 
 

1957 births
Living people
Australian female tennis players
Tennis players from Sydney
Australian Open (tennis) junior champions
Grand Slam (tennis) champions in girls' doubles